Roby is a city in and the county seat of Fisher County, Texas, United States. The population was 643 at the 2010 census.

History 

In 1885, shortly after Fisher County was organized, a dispute arose between business partners from Mississippi and a town called Fisher. Both wanted their land to host the courthouse.  The partners were M.L. and D.C. Roby, and the town of Fisher is now called North Roby.

In 1886, construction was begun on the new courthouse and a school and post office opened. The community had 13 houses by that summer.  In 1890, the population was estimated to be 300 people and the town had a hotel, two general stores, Baptist and Methodist churches, a restaurant, and a weekly newspaper, the Fisher County Call.

Roby had no jail until 1892, when one was constructed out of stone. A new jail was built in 1926 out of brick, and remained in use until 2016. In 2016, a new jail was built and the brick jailhouse was declared a historic landmark. 

It has had three different courthouses during its existence, unlike many Texas county seats, which have preserved and restored original courthouses.  The most recent courthouse was built in 1972, and is strikingly modern in comparison to those found in many Texas counties.

In 1898, the first bank was chartered and the Roby school district was formed.  The area covered by the school district grew slowly over the years as it absorbed rural schools in the vicinity, including those of Longworth and McCaulley.

By 1900, the population had grown to 712 residents. By 1914, it had Baptist, Methodist, Presbyterian, and Nazarene churches.  Telephone service was also established as of 1914.

Roby received its first railroad in 1907 (the Texas Central), and in 1915, the Roby and Northern laid 4.4 miles of track to connect Roby proper with North Roby.  It actually increased during the Great Depression—reaching 904 for the 1940 Census. The Roby and Northern line was scrapped during World War II and its rails went to the war effort.

Roby incorporated in 1915, and its population grew to 801 in 1930 and 904 in 1940.  The population peaked in 1950 with 1,040 people calling Roby and North Roby home, and 60 businesses. The city was plagued by insufficient water throughout its life and finally in 1953 during a long period of drought, water from Oak Creek Lake at Blackwell was piped in. By 1970, the population had fallen below 800 with 22 businesses in operation. It further declined to 616 in 1990 before rebounding to 673 in 2000, and as of the 2010 Census, the population had fallen to 643.

Geography

Roby is located at  (32.744839, –100.381100).

Roby is surrounded by wide cotton fields.

Demographics

2020 census

As of the 2020 United States census, 591 people, 306 households, and 216 families were residing in the city.

2000 census
As of the census of 2000,  673 people, 264 households, and 175 families resided in the city. The population density was 936.1 people per square mile (360.9/km). The 312 housing units  averaged 434.0 per square mile (167.3/km). The racial makeup of the city was 86.18% White, 3.27% African American, 0.45% Native American, 8.32% from other races, and 1.78% from two or more races. Hispanics or Latinos of any race were 22.14% of the population.

Of the 264 households, 31.1% had children under 18 living with them, 53.4% were married couples living together, 10.2% had a female householder with no husband present, and 33.7% were not families. About 31.1% of all households were made up of individuals, and 20.8% had someone living alone who was 65 or older. The average household size was 2.45, and the average family size was 3.13.

In the city, the age distribution was 27.8% under 18, 6.2% from 18 to 24, 25.1% from 25 to 44, 20.2% from 45 to 64, and 20.7% who were 65  or older. The median age was 37 years. For every 100 females, there were 80.4 males. For every 100 females 18 and over, there were 78.0 males.

The median income for a household in the city was $27,031, and for a family was $34,632. Males had a median income of $27,500 versus $19,286 for females. The per capita income for the city was $13,926. About 14.8% of families and 15.9% of the population were below the poverty line, including 18.9% of those under age 18 and 14.7% of those age 65 or over.

The Roby 42

Forty-two lucky residents of Roby put $10 each in a lottery pool in 1996 and won the $46,000,000 jackpot on Thanksgiving of that year, making 6–7% percent of the population millionaires instantly (before taxes).

Education
The City of Roby is served by the Roby Consolidated Independent School District and is home to the Roby High School Lions.

Climate
Roby's climate type occurs primarily on the periphery of the true deserts in low-latitude semiarid steppe regions. The Köppen climate classification subtype for this climate is BSk (tropical and subtropical steppe climate).

References

External links
 History of Roby Court Houses
 Handbook of Texas Online

Cities in Fisher County, Texas
Cities in Texas
County seats in Texas
1915 establishments in Texas